The Greece men's Under-20 national basketball team ((Greek young men's national basketball team)) is the representative for Greece in international Under-20 age basketball competitions, and it is organized and run by the Hellenic Basketball Federation (E.O.K.) The Greece men's Under-20 national basketball team represents Greece at the FIBA Europe Under-20 Championship. It was previously known as the Greek Under-22 national basketball team.

FIBA Europe Under-20 Championship

Team

Roster for the 2018 FIBA U20 European Championship

Under
Men's national under-20 basketball teams